This is a sequence of tables giving statistical data for past and future enlargements of the European Union. All data refer to the populations, land areas, and gross domestic products (GDP) of the respective countries at the time of their accession to the European Union, illustrating historically accurate changes to the Union. The GDP figures are at purchasing power parity, in United States dollar at 1990 prices.

Past enlargements

Foundation

1973 enlargement

1981 enlargement

1986 enlargement

1990 enlargement

1995 enlargement

2004 enlargement

2007 enlargement

2013 enlargement

UK withdrawal

Candidate countries

EU27

Albania

Montenegro

Moldova

North Macedonia

Serbia

Turkey

Ukraine

All Candidates 

Note: All data sourced from individual country entries on Wikipedia. Populations usually 2021 estimates; historical/future estimates not used. Figures are approximate due to fluctuations in population and economies.

See also
Demographics of the European Union

Footnotes
1.  Algeria was part of France until 1962.2.  German reunification in 1990 led to the inclusion of the territory of the former German Democratic Republic. This enlargement is not explicitly mentioned. Data for Germany in all tables is from current statistics.3.  Greenland left the EC in 1985.4.  Officially the whole of Cyprus lies within the European Union. "In light of Protocol 10 of the Accession Treaty 2003 Cyprus as a whole entered the EU, whereas the acquis is suspended in the northern part of the island ("areas not under effective control of the Government of the Republic of Cyprus"). This means inter alia that these areas are outside the customs and fiscal territory of the EU. The suspension has territorial effect, but does not concern the personal rights of Turkish Cypriots as EU citizens, as they are considered as citizens of the Member State Republic of Cyprus".

References

Citations

Enlargement of the European Union